was a district located in Hyōgo Prefecture, Japan.

As of 2003, the district had an estimated population of 53,638 and a density of 234.05 persons per km2. The total area was 229.17 km2.

Former towns and villages
 Midori
 Mihara
 Nandan
 Seidan

Merger
On January 11, 2005 - the towns of Midori, Mihara, Nandan and Seidan were merged to create the city of Minamiawaji. Mihara District was dissolved as a result of this merger.

References 

Former districts of Hyōgo Prefecture